Ung Huot (born 2 March 1945) is a Cambodian former politician who served from 1997 to 1998 as Prime Minister of Cambodia, alongside Hun Sen. A member of the FUNCINPEC Party, he first served as Minister of Education, and later as Minister of Foreign Affairs before being appointed as Prime Minister.

Life and career
Ung Huot was born in 1945 in Kandal Province. He studied accounting and finance and was awarded a scholarship to study in Australia in 1971, as Cambodia's civil war was beginning. He received a Master of Business Administration from the University of Melbourne, and became an Australian citizen. He settled in Melbourne and proclaimed himself a leader of the Cambodian expatriate committee in that city. He moved back to Cambodia in 1991 as the communist government was falling, and became a high-ranking official in the FUNCINPEC party. He became the Minister of Education, and in 1994 he left that post to become foreign minister.

In July 1997, FUNCINPEC leader Norodom Ranariddh, who was serving as first prime minister, was deposed by second prime minister Hun Sen of FUNCINPEC's rival and coalition partner, the Cambodian People's Party. Hun invited Ung to become first prime minister to replace Ranariddh. Ranariddh's father, King Norodom Sihanouk at first refused to recognize the arrangement, but Ung became first prime minister in August 1997 after being elected by Parliament. When some people within FUNCINPEC accused Ung of being a puppet, he was forced to leave FUNCINPEC and form his own party, the Reastr-Niyum Party (Populist Party). In the 1998 elections, the Reastr-Niyum Party did not gain any seats in Parliament, and Ung was forced to resign from the posts of first prime minister and foreign minister, leaving Hun to be the sole prime minister.

References

|-
 

1945 births
Living people
Cambodian Buddhists
20th-century Cambodian politicians
Cambodian emigrants to Australia
Cambodian people of Chinese descent
Australian people of Cambodian descent
Australian people of Chinese descent
FUNCINPEC politicians
Prime Ministers of Cambodia
Foreign ministers of Cambodia
Government ministers of Cambodia
Members of the National Assembly (Cambodia)
People from Kandal province
People from Melbourne
Naturalised citizens of Australia
Royal University of Phnom Penh alumni
University of Melbourne alumni